The Gujarat Beechcraft incident was an event during the Indo-Pakistani War of 1965. On 19 September that year an American-made F-86 Sabre jet fighter of the Pakistan Air Force (PAF) shot down an Indian-registered civilian Beechcraft Model 18 twin-engine light aircraft. Balwantrai Mehta, who at the time was the chief minister of the Indian state of Gujarat, was killed in the attack along with his wife, three members of his staff, a journalist and two crew members.

Qais Hussain, a PAF flying officer during the 1965 war, was the pilot who fired on the civilian aircraft under orders from his superiors. In August 2011 he wrote to Farida Singh, the daughter of the deceased civilian pilot, via email, expressing his condolences.

See also
Atlantique incident

References

External links
The Gujarat Beechcraft Incident – 1965 War

Mass murder in 1965
Airliner shootdown incidents
Indo-Pakistani War of 1965
Aviation accidents and incidents in India
Accidents and incidents involving the Beechcraft Model 18
Aviation accidents and incidents in 1965
History of Gujarat (1947–present)
Disasters in Gujarat
Kutch district
20th-century aircraft shootdown incidents
September 1965 events in Asia
Bhuj